Official Opposition designates the political party which has secured the second largest number of seats in either upper or lower houses. To get formal recognition in either upper or lower houses, the concerned party must have at least 10% of the total strength of the house. A single party has to meet the 10% seat criterion, not an alliance. Many of the Indian state legislatures also follow this 10% rule while the rest of them prefer single largest opposition party according to the rules of their respective houses.

Role 
The Opposition's main role is to question the government of the day and hold them accountable to the public. This also helps to fix the mistakes of the Ruling Party. The Opposition is equally responsible in upholding the best interests of the people of the country. They have to ensure that the Government does not take any steps, which might have negative effects on the people of the country.

The role of the opposition in legislature is basically to check the excesses of the ruling or dominant party, and not to be totally antagonistic. There are actions of the ruling party which may be beneficial to the masses and opposition is expected to support such steps.

In legislature the Opposition Party has a major role, which is:

 Constructive criticism of government.
 Putting restriction on arbitrariness of ruling party. 
 Safeguarding liberty and right of people.
 Preparation to form government.
 Expression of public opinion.

Current official opposition parties

Parliament 
This is the list of current opposition parties in the Parliament of India:

Legislative Assemblies 
This is the list of current opposition parties in the Legislative Assemblies of the Indian states and union territories:.

Legislative Councils 
This is the list of current opposition parties in the Legislative Councils of the Indian states:

See also 
 List of current Indian opposition leaders
 List of current Indian ruling and opposition parties

References

Further reading 

 

Parliament of India
India